Korea Republic women's national under-17 football team represents Republic of Korea in international youth football competitions.

Competitive record

FIFA U-17 Women's World Cup

AFC U-17 Women's Asian Cup

Results and fixtures

2022

U-15

Official South Korea U-17 results

Coaching staff

Current coaching staff
As of November 2022

Players

Current squad
The following U-15 players were named to the squad for three friendlies against Australia on 30 October, on 2 November, and on 5 November 2022.

|-----
! colspan="9" bgcolor="#B0D3FB" align="left" |
|----- bgcolor="#DFEDFD"

|-----
! colspan="9" bgcolor="#B0D3FB" align="left" |
|----- bgcolor="#DFEDFD"

|-----
! colspan="9" bgcolor="#B0D3FB" align="left" |
|----- bgcolor="#DFEDFD"

Records

Most capped players

Top goal scorers

See also

National teams
Women's
South Korea women's national football team
South Korea women's national under-20 football team
South Korea women's national under-17 football team
South Korea women's national futsal team

References

External links
Official website, KFA.or.kr 
KWFL official website 

 
Youth football in South Korea
Asian women's national under-17 association football teams
Football